Nils Arne Sletbak (16  January 1896 – 24 January 1982) was a Norwegian jurist and theatre director.

Sletbak was born in Sunndal, Norway.
He graduated as a cand.jur. at the University of Oslo.

He was an active proponent for Nynorsk culture and language. He was chairman of the board of Det Norske Teatret from 1932 to 1935, chairman of the organization Bondeungdomslaget in Oslo, and contributor to the newspaper Den 17de Mai. He was theatre director of Det Norske Teatret from 1953 to 1961.

References

1896 births
1982 deaths
People from Møre og Romsdal
Norwegian theatre directors
University of Oslo alumni
People from Sunndal